Jam Feruzuddin Al-Maroof Jam Unar bin Babinah was the  first ruler of the Samma dynasty, which ruled Sindh and parts of Punjab from 1335–1520 C.E.

History 

It was in 752 A.H. (1351 C.E.) that Jám Unar son of Babinah was proclaimed the ruler of Sind. In a very short time, Jám Unar was sufficiently strong enough to attack Sehwán. Ratan, a Hindu, was at that time the governor of the region, on behalf of the king of Dehlí. He came out to meet Jám Unar and defeated him in a battle, but the next day Jám Unar returned to fight with redoubled force. He defeated Ratan, who accidentally fell from his horse and into the hands of his enemy, who cut off his head with a blow. The fort of Sehwán was then soon taken. 

Upon returning to his capital, Jám Unar began to lead a luxurious life. One day while he was drunk, information was received of some rising at a short distance. The Jám deputed his agent Káhah son of Tamáchí to put down the rebellion. As Káhah himself was in an intoxicated state, he was soon taken prisoner by the mob. Jám Unar was so busy in his profligacies that he had no time to think of his agent’s release. Naturally, Káhah was much annoyed at his master’s want of sympathy. He managed to effect an escape, and leaving the side of Jám Unar for good, came to Bakhar and joined Alí Sháh and Malak Feróz Tartars. Bringing them to Bahrámpur got Jám Unar killed. Some say that Alí Sháh and Malak Feróz had already started from Bakhar to be avenged on Jám Unar for his taking the fort of Sehwán and killing Malak Ratan. After 3 days, however, the Sammahs killed Káhah and Malak Feróz. Alí Sháh had already gone back to Bakhar. 

Jám Unar reigned for 3 years and 6 months. He was succeeded by his brother Júnah.

Origin and Establishment 
According to Chachnama, Samma was a branch of Lohana tribe. Ala al-Din Khiljl (1296-1316) mounted a number of campaigns in the region battling the Sumra princes whose cycle of capitulation/rebellion could be charted exactly to the perceived military stress on the metropole. Yet, the Delhi Sultans and their governor rarely resorted to invading Sumra held ter- ritories - relying, instead, on alliances with tribal elite and local power strug- gles. Against the Sumras, Khiljl advanced the cause of the Lohana tribe of Samma. The conflict guaranteed a rolling supply of princes and tribal chiefs wanting alliances with the center. The tussle for dominance between the Sumras and the Samma lasted until the reign of Firuz Shah Tughluq (1351- 1388), when the Jam emirs of Samma were finally able to end Sumra dominance, taking over lower Sindh.

References
 A History of Sind, Volume II, Translated from Persian Books by Mirza Kalichbeg Fredunbeg, chpt. 14

This article includes content derived from "History of Sind - translated from Persian books" by Mirza Kalichbeg Fredunbeg (1853-1929), published in Karachi in 1902 and now in the public domain.

History of Sindh